Alertez les bébés ! is the sixth album by French rock singer Jacques Higelin, released in 1976. The album is named after the central song on the album, a ten-minute long track, written quickly in a feverish state by the singer, with the recording being made live in one take.

Critical reception
The album received the Grand Prix du Disque de l'Académie Charles Cros. The French edition of Rolling Stone magazine named it the 29th greatest French rock album.

Track listing

Personnel

Musicians
 Pierre Chérèze - electric guitar, lead guitar, rhythm guitar
 Christian Leroux - electric guitar, rhythm guitar, acoustic lead guitar
 Jacky Thomas - bass guitar
 Michel Santangelli - drums, tambourine, mandocello
 Jacques Higelin - vocals, keyboards, piano
 Danielle Bartholetti, Françoise Walle - background vocals
 Stéphane Vilar - brass

Production
 Paul Semama: recording, mixing
 Thierry Vincent: production

References 

1976 albums
Jacques Higelin albums
Pathé-Marconi albums
EMI Records albums